Temple Emanuel is a Reform synagogue in Grand Rapids, Michigan.  The congregation was founded in 1857 and describes itself as the fifth oldest Reform congregation in the United States. The congregation erected its first building in 1882 at the corner of Fountain and Ransom Streets. The architect was D.S. Hopkins.   In 1996 it was in use as an office building and was the oldest synagogue building still standing in Michigan. The Temple has a notable 1926 Tiffany glass window depicting the biblical story of Ruth and Boaz. The window was moved from the 1882 building when the congregation erected a new building in 1952. The 1952 building is by Erich Mendelsohn (1887–1953).

External links
 Temple Emanuel website

References

Religious organizations established in 1857
Buildings and structures in Grand Rapids, Michigan
Reform synagogues in Michigan
1857 establishments in Michigan
Synagogues completed in 1952